"Nothing Lasts Forever" is the ninth episode of the eleventh season of the American science fiction television series The X-Files. The episode was written by Karen Nielsen, and directed by James Wong. It aired on March 14, 2018, on Fox.

The show centers on FBI special agents who work on unsolved paranormal cases called X-Files; focusing on the investigations of Fox Mulder (David Duchovny), and Dana Scully (Gillian Anderson) after their reinstatement in the FBI. In this episode, Mulder and Scully, while investigating human organ theft, uncover a mysterious cult consumed with macabre rituals.  The tagline for this episode is "I want to be beautiful."

Plot

At a makeshift operating theater in the Bronx, two surgeons harvest a man of his organs, killing him in the process. The operation is interrupted by Juliet, a young woman who kills the surgeons by driving metal spikes through their chests. She manages to secure most of the organs and delivers them to a nearby hospital with a message: "I will repay".

Fox Mulder and Dana Scully are drawn to the case because evidence suggests that it was a ritual killing. The police dismiss Mulder's speculation and believe the murders are related to an organ theft ring, pointing out that one of the surgeons had his medical license revoked and was an associate of the Russian mafia. Meeting at a church, the agents briefly debate the nature of faith. Scully confirms that all legal organ donations have been accounted for while Mulder has found no trace of illegal sales on the dark web. Mulder links the killer's message to a psalm about God's vengeance, and notices that iron bars matching the murder weapon's distinctive shape have been removed from the church fence. Because of this, Mulder comes to believe that the murders are driven by divine wrath instead of demonic worship.

A conversation with a priest leads them to Juliet, who tells Mulder and Scully that her sister Olivia joined a cult. Meanwhile, the missing organs are taken to the home of reclusive TV star Barbara Beaumont (based on the names of sitcom stars Barbara Billingsley and Hugh Beaumont) and her partner Randolph Luvenis. Beaumont has formed a cult, Randy Organ Harvesters (named after her partner, Randolph), which consumes human organs to offset the aging process; despite being eighty-five years old, Beaumont appears to be thirty. The effects are only temporary, leading Luvenis to surgically conjoin himself to others, parasitically feeding off them to reverse his age. Together, they have been feeding organs to their followers and plan to conjoin them to Barbara in the hopes of giving her eternal youth. However, tensions arise when the stolen organs are not enough to feed the cult. As Luvenis leaves to steal the remaining organs from the hospital, a cult member offers himself as a sacrifice to sustain the others. After he stabs himself, he is eaten alive.

Knowing that the stolen organs can never be used in a transplant, Mulder and Scully arrange for a tracking device to be placed in a heart for Luvenis to retrieve. They follow the signal to Beaumont's house and attempt to gain access, unaware of Juliet's presence. Luvenis, suffering accelerated ageing without a host, undergoes surgery to attach himself to Olivia. Once inside the house, the agents are overpowered by Beaumont's followers, who throw Scully down an elevator shaft. Mulder is rescued by Juliet, who kills Beaumont with a metal stake to the chest. Beaumont's death dishearten her followers, allowing Mulder to escape. As he tries to locate Scully in the basement, Mulder is confronted by Luvenis, who has the appearance and strength of a much younger man after being conjoined to Olivia. Luvenis boasts to Mulder that he has cured aging, which he regards as a disease. Olivia proclaims her faith in Luvenis's methods, but she begins to seize, and when Mulder demands that she be taken to a hospital, Luvenis threatens to cut her throat. Juliet catches up with them and kills Luvenis; she then surrenders to Mulder. Scully is found to be safe, having been cushioned by trash thrown away by the cult.

In the aftermath, Olivia is shown safe and healthy at home with her mother, who is now praying for Juliet. Mulder and Scully return to the church. Mulder acknowledges the power of faith, suggesting that his atheism is because he does not need faith rather than because of a lack of it.

Production

Filming
Filming for the season began in August 2017 in Vancouver, British Columbia, where the previous season was filmed, along with the show's original five seasons. The episode was directed by James Wong.

Writing
The episode was written by Karen Nielsen, her first writing credit for the series. Nielsen also served as the script coordinator for seasons 10 and 11. Nielsen's inspiration for the episode was revealed in an interview with SyfyWire:

Even though the episode is the penultimate episode of the season, Nielsen felt she wanted the final scene of the episode to relate to the upcoming conclusion. She wanted everything to lead up to William, trying to build some momentum that she felt was needed.

Reception

Critical reception
"Nothing Lasts Forever" received positive reviews from critics. On Rotten Tomatoes, it has an approval rating of 100% with an average rating of 7.6 out of 10 based on 9 reviews. Liz Shannon Miller of IndieWire called the episode a pretty on-the-nose title, but one worth letting rattle around in the brains this week, as preparation for the season finale.

Ratings
In its initial broadcast in the United States on March 14, 2018, it received 3.01 million viewers, which was a decrease from the previous episode, which had 3.46 million viewers.

References

External links

2018 American television episodes
The X-Files (season 11) episodes
Television episodes about cannibalism